Last Alliance may refer to:

The Last Alliance (band), an American power metal band inspired by the J. R. R. Tolkien and George R R Martin
Last Alliance (band), a Japanese rock band
The Last Alliance (album), an album by the power metal band Battlelore